The 1912 Vanderbilt Commodores baseball team represented the Vanderbilt Commodores of the Vanderbilt University in the 1912 NCAA baseball season, winning the SIAA championship.

Schedule and results
The game with Tech on April 20 was cancelled due to rain.

Players
Wilson Collins - pitcher
Kent Morrison - pitcher
Jones - pitcher
Will Herrin - pitcher
Ray Morrison - catcher
Enoch Brown - catcher
Ewing Y. Freeland - first base
Richard Lyle - second base
Lloyd - shortstop
W. H. Turner - third base
Lew Hardage - left field
Walter Morgan - center field
Joe Covington - right field

Staff
Jack Sevier-manager

References

Vanderbilt Commodores
Vanderbilt Commodores baseball seasons
Southern Intercollegiate Athletic Association baseball champion seasons
1912 in sports in Tennessee